Sohrab Goth Town is a suburban area in the Malir district of Karachi, Pakistan, that previously was a part of Gadap Town until 2011. It acts as an entry point to Karachi from the rest of Pakistan. There is a bridge over the Lyari River connecting other areas of Karachi to Sohrab Goth. Bridge building started in 2000 and was completed in 2006.

Sohrab Goth is an illegal goth settlement on encroached land public land built in 1970s.

The 2019 Azadi March commenced from this city.

Population 
Sohrab Goth Town has a total population of 428,000.

Demography
The population of Sohrab Goth is predominantly Sindhi. The ethnic groups in Sohrab Goth include Pakhtuns, Muhajir, Sindhis, Punjabis, Kashmiris, Seraikis, Balochs, Memons, etc.

See also 
 Lalu Goth

References 

Neighbourhoods of Karachi
Gadap Town